The 1975 NAIA World Series was the 19th annual tournament hosted by the National Association of Intercollegiate Athletics to determine the national champion of baseball among its member colleges and universities in the United States and Canada.

The tournament was again played at Phil Welch Stadium in St. Joseph, Missouri.

In a rematch of the previous year's final, defending champions Lewis (IL) (52-16) defeated Sam Houston State (43-14) in a single-game championship series, 2–1, to win the Flyers' second NAIA World Series.

Lewis pitcher Don Markelz was named tournament MVP.

Bracket

See also
 1975 NCAA Division I baseball tournament
 1975 NCAA Division II baseball tournament

Reference

NAIA World Series
NAIA World Series
NAIA World Series